Monte Alto may refer to:
 Monte Alto culture, an archaeological site on the Pacific Coast in what is now Guatemala
 Monte Alto, São Paulo, a municipality in the state of São Paulo, Brazil
 Monte Alto, Texas, United States
 Monte Alto Protected Zone, in Costa Rica
 Mount Alto, Kilkenny, a County Kilkenny hill, Ireland